Mimoscorpius is a monotypic genus of Thelyphonid whip scorpions, first described by Reginald Innes Pocock in 1894. Its single species, Mimoscorpius pugnator is distributed in Guatemala.

References 

Arachnid genera
Monotypic arachnid genera
Uropygi